"I Wonder If I Take You Home" is a song recorded by Lisa Lisa and Cult Jam with Full Force in 1984.  Record Producer Kenny Beck discovered the song in a "discard bin" at Personal Records while looking for songs to include on his debut album with the label. He was so impressed that he created a compilation break-dancing album, CBS/SuzyQ, just to include the song. He released the album in Europe on CBS Records, and it immediately gained popularity as a dance hit with club DJs there. Soon American DJs began playing the song in the United States on Columbia Records. After the song received heavy play from these DJs, "I Wonder If I Take You Home" reached No. 1 on the Billboard Hot Dance Club Play chart for one week in June 1985. On other US charts, it peaked at No. 6 on the R&B chart and reached No. 34 on the Hot 100. In 1991, the single was certified as gold in the U.S. by the RIAA. Overseas, it charted at No. 12 on the UK Singles Chart and #41 in the Netherlands.

Critical reception 
"I Wonder If I Take You Home" was voted the eighth best single of 1985 in The Village Voices annual Pazz & Jop critics poll. Robert Christgau, the poll's creator, ranked it twelfth on his own list of the year's best singles.

Legacy
Its chorus has been interpolated in The Black Eyed Peas's 2005 hit song, "Don't Phunk With My Heart", Fabolous's song with Lil' Mo entitled "Take You Home," in the Angie Martinez single "Take You Home" featuring Kelis, and rapper Big Moe's song "I Wonder." The song has also been sampled by Kylie Minogue (in her song "Secret (Take You Home)"), Pitbull (in his song "I Wonder", featuring Oobie), R&B singer Paula Campbell in her single "Take You Home," which garnered much airplay on urban radio-stations around the Baltimore-DC area and in the Junior M.A.F.I.A. featuring Aaliyah single, "I Need You Tonight". In 2010, singer Adrienne Bailon and rapper Ghostface Killah covered the song as "Take You Home". which is the lead single off her yet-untitled debut album. In 2012, rapper Meek Mill used the chorus and a remixed beat for his song "Take You Home", featuring Wale and Big Sean, off his Dreamchasers 2 mixtape. In 2018, American singer-songwriter, rapper, and bassist Meshell Ndegeocello released a cover version of the song, featured on her album Ventriloquism.

See also
 List of number-one dance singles of 1985 (U.S.)

References

External links
Discogs

1984 songs
1985 debut singles
Lisa Lisa and Cult Jam songs